Ryan Sinnamon (born 22 July 1996) is a Scottish footballer who plays for Auchinleck Talbot.

Club career
Sinnamon started his career at Rangers, playing for the Under-20 side. In June 2015, he signed a contract extension with Rangers and two months later joined Falkirk on loan for six months. Whilst with the Bairns, Sinnamon made his Falkirk, and senior professional debut, in a Scottish Championship match against Dumbarton on 24 October 2015. However, he did not feature for Falkirk again due to injury and returned to Rangers in January 2016. 

In September 2016, Sinnamon joined Scottish League Two side Annan Athletic on loan until January 2017. On 11 January 2017 he was released by Rangers without making a single appearance for the Glasgow club, and was subsequently signed by Scottish League Two side Elgin City. In July 2017, Sinnamon returned to Galabank to sign for Annan Athletic on a permanent contract. After a season with East Kilbride, Sinnamon rejoined Annan in March 2021.

Sinnamon signed a precontract with Lowland League club Broomhill in May 2021.

After a year with Broomhill, Sinnamon signed for Pollok in the West of Scotland Football League in July 2022. He left the club by mutual consent in February 2023 and therefore has joined Auchinleck Talbot.

International career
Sinnamon was capped by the Scotland national under-19 football team making thirteen appearances, his final match coming in 2015.

Career statistics

References

External links
 
 

1996 births
Living people
Scottish footballers
Association football defenders
Rangers F.C. players
Falkirk F.C. players
Annan Athletic F.C. players
Scottish Professional Football League players
Scotland youth international footballers
Elgin City F.C. players
Footballers from Greenock
Broomhill F.C. (Scotland) players
East Kilbride F.C. players
Lowland Football League players